Belmonte is a Portuguese telenovela broadcast and produced by TVI. It was written by Artur Ribeiro and adapted from the Chilean telenovela Hijos del Monte. The telenovela premiered on September 22, 2013 and its last episode aired on September 5, 2014, totaling a number of 259 episodes. It was broadcast in the primetime at 9pm (UTC) and then switched to the 11pm (UTC) slot. Some of the first scenes were recorded in Brazil, but the telenovela was mainly recorded in Portugal, in the region of Alentejo.

It is the 5th Portuguese telenovela (the 3rd from TVI) nominated for Best telenovela in the 2014 Emmy International.

Plot
In the Municipality of Estremoz, in the Alentejo, five children, adopted by the Alentejo patriarch Emílio Belmonte (António Capelo), manage a business group named Belmonte, owner of companies in the business of winemaking, oils, marble exploration, hunting tourism, and financial investments and real estate.

The Belmonte family is linked to the ancient history of the region, but Emílio, the last descendant of the family, married Clarisse, a woman who could not have children and, as such, to the survival of the name, the couple had to adopt children. Each of the four older brothers, João (Filipe Duarte), José (João Catarré), Pedro (Diogo Amaral) and Carlos (Marco D'Almeida), is responsible, respectively, for one of the business areas, while Lucas (Lourenço Ortigão), the youngest, was studying photography in London. Business, despite the crisis, is stable and family harmony is evident, continuing the five brothers to live together in the family's homestead.

While in the Alentejo are made some preparations for the engagement between João and Julieta (Carla Galvão) - daughter of another older family from the region, but bankrupt, the Milheiro family - in Brazil, Emílio is with Sofia (Manuela Couto) and her daughter, Paula (Graziella Schmitt), revealing that Emílio has another family.

Sofia was Emílio's lover and became pregnant at the time Clarisse was ill with terminal cancer. Because Sofia refused to abort, Emílio paid her to move to Brazil where she gave birth to Paula, who nobody ever told was the daughter of an extramarital relationship growing with the false story that the father spends most of his time in Portugal because of business, in hope to one day sell it to reform in Brazil and stay with his Brazilian family.

After a day of happiness «in family», on his farm in the Pantanal (Brazil), Emílio returns to Portugal, leaving Paula in tears, as always, in time to say goodbye. What she doesn't know is that she is saying goodbye to her father forever. On the way to the airport, Emílio sees what appears to be a road accident and decides to stop to help. But what appeared to be an accident is actually a fatal ambush for Emílio planned by his son Carlos.

Cast

Main
Filipe Duarte - João Belmonte
Graziella Schmitt - Paula Belmonte
João Catarré - José Belmonte
Marco D'Almeida - Carlos Belmonte
Diogo Amaral - Pedro Belmonte
Lourenço Ortigão - Lucas Belmonte
Manuela Couto - Sofia Caneira/Belmonte

Secondary
Carla Galvão- Julieta Milheiro
Joana Solnado - Inês Belmonte
Elsa Galvão - Filomena Guerreiro
João Didelet - Rafael Guerreiro 
Rita Calçada Bastos - Ana Craft 
Romeu Costa - Henrique Craft 
Tomás Alves - Hugo Queirós
Luísa Cruz - Susana Marques «1st sergeant»
Sara Matos - Marta Nogueira
Sílvia Rizzo - Carol Molina
Laura Galvão - Joana Brito
Almeno Gonçalves - Gustavo Castelo
Paulo Pires - Padre Artur Ribas
Bruna Quintas - Rosário Milheiro
Helena Laureano - Anabela Milheiro
José Wallenstein - Miguel Milheiro
Sabri Lucas - Flip
Sara Prata - Íris
Norman McCallum - Alistair Conrad
Sofia Grillo - Beatriz Figueira
Adriano Carvalho - Joaquim Figueira
Maria de Sousa - Luísa Ferreira
António Melo - Fernando Ferreira
Sandra Santos - Sónia

Special Participation
Estrela Novais - D. Maria

Children
Afonso Carlos - António Figueira
Manuel Custódia - Ivo Craft
Maria Carolina Iláco - Leonor Guerreiro

Recurring
António Capelo - Emílio Belmonte
Sofia Ribeiro - Laura Pires

Awards

References

Portuguese telenovelas
Televisão Independente telenovelas
2013 Portuguese television series debuts
2014 Portuguese television series endings
2013 telenovelas
Portuguese-language telenovelas